Roy Houghton (born 31 March 1921) is an English former footballer who played as an outside-right in the Football League for Notts County.

Houghton made eight appearances for Notts County during the 1937–38 season. After spells at Grantham and Boston United, he joined  Peterborough United, where he scored 14 goals in 59 Midland League and FA Cup games.

His brother, Eric Houghton, and cousin, Reg Goodacre, were also footballers.

References

1921 births
Possibly living people
People from Billingborough
Footballers from Lincolnshire
English footballers
Association football outside forwards
Notts County F.C. players
Grantham Town F.C. players
Boston United F.C. players
Peterborough United F.C. players
English Football League players